Cusco Province is the smallest of thirteen provinces in the Cusco Region in the southern highlands of Peru.

Geography 
Some of the highest mountains of the province are listed below:

Political division
The province is divided into eight districts (singular: distrito), each of which is headed by a mayor (alcalde). The districts, with their capitals in parenthesis, are:

 Cusco (Cusco) (seat)
 Ccorca (Ccorca)
 Poroy (Poroy)
 San Jerónimo (San Jerónimo)
 San Sebastián (San Sebastián)
 Santiago (Santiago)
 Saylla (Saylla)
 Wanchaq (Wanchaq)

Ethnic groups 
The province is inhabited by indigenous citizens of Quechua descent. Spanish is the language which the majority of the population (80.87%) learnt to speak in childhood, 18.22% of the residents started speaking using the Quechua language (2007 Peru Census).

Archaeological sites 
Some of the most important archaeological sites of the province are as follows:

See also
 Santurantikuy

References 

Provinces of the Cusco Region